Inflection (or inflexion),  is the modification of a word to express grammatical information.

Inflection or inflexion may also refer to:
Inflection point, a point at which a curve changes from being concave to convex, or vice versa
Chromatic inflection, alteration of a musical note that makes it chromatic
Accidental (music), a note that is not a member of the scale indicated by the key signature
A change in tone of voice; see Intonation (linguistics)

See also